This is a list of pre-statehood alcaldes and mayors of San Diego, from 1770 to 1850, during the Spanish, Mexican, and early American periods, prior to California's admission to statehood.

Commandants of the Presidio of San Diego
From 1770 San Diego was ruled by a commandant from the Presidio of San Diego under the Spanish and (from 1822) Mexican governments.
When San Diego became a Pueblo in 1835, an alcalde (mayor) of San Diego served under the Mexican and pre-statehood United States governments.

Alcaldes of the Pueblo of San Diego

San Diego became a pueblo in 1834, after a petition to Governor José Figueroa endorsed by Commandant Santiago Arguello. The first Alcalde (mayor) Juan María Osuna was elected, defeating Pío Pico by 13 votes. By 1838, the population shrank enough to lose its pueblo status and was ruled by a Juez de Paz as a partition of the Los Angeles District until San Diego was incorporated as a city under U.S. rule.

The following are the Juez de Paz and Alcaldes (Justices of the Peace and Mayors) of San Diego. In this table "suplente" means substitute.

See also
Mayor of San Diego
List of pre-statehood mayors of Los Angeles
List of pre-statehood mayors of San Francisco
List of pre-statehood mayors of San Jose

External links
 Mayors of U.S. Cities: San Diego
 "Justices of the Peace (Alcaldes)", History of San Diego by Richard F. Pourade
 "List of Spanish and Mexican Military Commandants at San Diego, 1769–1840", History of San Diego by Richard F. Pourade
 "List of Spanish and Mexican Military Commandants at San Diego, 1769–1840", History of San Diego by William E. Smythe

History of San Diego County, California
San Diego, California, before statehood
 
San Diego
San Diego
Los Angeles
Los Angeles
mayors